USS Manila Bay (CVE-61) was a  of the United States Navy.

She was laid down as Bucareli Bay (ACV-61) under Maritime Commission contract by Kaiser Company, Inc., Vancouver, Washington on 15 January 1943; renamed Manila Bay on 3 April 1943; launched on 10 July 1943; sponsored by Mrs. Robert W. Bockius; reclassified CVE-61 on 15 July 1943; acquired by the Navy on 5 October 1943; and commissioned the same day at Astoria, Oregon, Captain Boynton L. Braun in command.

Service history

World War II
After a shakedown cruise along the west coast, Manila Bay sailed for Pearl Harbor on 20 November and returned a load of damaged planes to San Diego on 4 December. After training exercises, with Composite Squadron 7 (VC-7) embarked, she departed Hawaii on 3 January 1944. A week later she embarked Rear Admiral Ralph Davidson and became flagship for Carrier Division 24. Joining Task Force 52 (TF 52), she sortied 22 January for the invasion of the Marshall Islands. Between 31 January-6 February, she launched air and antisubmarine patrols as well as dozens of combat missions. Her planes bombed and strafed enemy positions from Kwajalein Island north to Bigej Island and destroyed ammunition dumps and ground installations. She remained in the Marshalls during the next month and extended her operations late in February first to Eniwetok and then to Majuro.

Departing Majuro on 7 March, Manila Bay reached Espiritu Santo on the 12th. Three days later she joined TF 37 for airstrikes and surface bombardments against Kavieng, New Ireland on 19–20 March. During the next month she cruised between the Solomons and the Bismarck Archipelago supporting the protracted offensive to neutralize the Archipelago and the Japanese fortress at Rabaul. Thence, on 19 April she steamed so that her planes could attack enemy positions on New Guinea.

New Guinea
American naval and ground forces began a three–pronged invasion along northern New Guinea at Aitape, Hollandia, and Tanahmerah Bay on 22 April. During and after the invasion Manila Bay launched protective air patrols and sent fighters and bombers to attack and destroy Japanese installations in the Aitape area. On 4 May she returned to Manus Island where Rear Admiral Felix Stump relieved Admiral Davidson as Commander, Carrier Division 24.

After loading 37 Army Republic P-47 Thunderbolts of the Army Air Forces' 73rd Fighter Squadron, 318th Fighter Group, Manila Bay sailed on 5 June for the Mariana Islands. Steaming via Eniwetok, she reached the eastern approaches to Saipan on 19 June. During the next 4 days, she remained east of the embattled island as ships and planes of the Fast Carrier Task Force repulsed the Japanese Fleet in the Battle of the Philippine Sea, and inflicted staggering losses on the enemy, crippling the Imperial Navy’s air strength permanently.

On 23 June, Manila Bay came under enemy air attack during refueling operations east of Saipan. Four Aichi D3A Val dive bombers attacked her from dead ahead, dropping their bombs which exploded wide to port. As a precautionary and rather unusual move which Raymond A. Spruance later characterized as "commendable initiative", Manila Bay launched four of the P-47 Thunderbolts she was ferrying to fly protective CAP until radar screens were clear of contacts. The Army fighters then flew to Saipan, their intended destination. Manila Bay launched the remaining planes the next day and returned to Eniwetok, arriving on 27 June. After embarking 207 wounded troops, she departed on 1 July, touched Pearl Harbor on the 8th, and reached San Diego on 16 July.

Manila Bay returned to Pearl on 31 August. Two days later, Captain Fitzhugh Lee III took command of the veteran carrier, and after embarking VC-80, Manila Bay departed on 15 September as a unit of Carrier Division 24 (CarDiv 24). Steaming via Eniwetok, she reached Manus 3 October and began final preparations for the invasion of the Philippines at Leyte Gulf.

Leyte Gulf
Assigned to the Task Group 77.4 (TG 77.4), Manila Bay departed on 12 October for waters east of the Philippines. Prior to the invasion, her planes pounded enemy ground targets on Leyte, Samar, and Cebu Islands. She launched ground support, spotting, and air cover strikes during the amphibious assaults on 20 October, and she sent bombers and fighters to support ground forces during the critical first few days at Leyte.

As Manila Bay cruised to the east of Leyte Gulf with other carriers of Admiral Stump's "Taffy 2" (Task Unit 77.4.2, TU 77.4.2), powerful Japanese naval forces converged upon the Philippines and launched a three-pronged offensive to drive the Americans from Leyte. In a series of masterful and coordinated surface attacks, an American battleship, cruiser, and destroyer force met and destroyed enemy ships in the Battle of Surigao Strait early on 25 October. Surviving Japanese ships retreated into the Mindanao Sea pursued by destroyers, PT boats, and after sunrise by carrier-based bombers and fighters.

Manila Bay sent an eight-plane strike against ground targets on Leyte before sunrise; subsequently, these planes bombed and strafed retiring enemy ships southwest of Panaon Island. A second strike about midmorning pounded the cruiser . In the meantime, however, Manila Bay turned her planes against a more immediate threat: the enemy attack against ships of Taffy 3.

Samar

A running battle ensued between the escort carriers of Rear Adm. Clifton Sprague's Taffy 3 and the larger, vastly more powerful surface ships of Vice Admiral Takeo Kurita's Center Force. The self-sacrificing attacks by American destroyers and destroyer escorts, and the prompt, aggressive, and unceasing torpedo, bomb, and strafing strikes by planes from Taffy 2 and Taffy 3 contributed to the American victory against great odds in the Battle off Samar.

Manila Bay launched two airstrikes during the enemy pursuit of Taffy 3 and two more as the Japanese retreated. At 08:30, she sent four torpedo-laden Grumman TBM Avengers and a seven-plane escort to join the desperate fight. Three launched torpedoes at a battleship, probably , but they missed. The fourth plane launched her torpedo at a heavy cruiser, most likely . It hit the ship to starboard near the fantail, forcing her out of control. The second strike an hour later by two Avengers resulted in one torpedo hit on the portside amidships against an unidentified battleship.

As the Japanese ships broke off attack and circled off Samar, the airstrikes continued. At 11:20, Manila Bay launched four Avengers, carrying 500 pound bombs, and four bombers from other carriers. Escorted by General Motors FM-2 Wildcats and led by Commander R. L. Fowler, they soon joined planes from other Taffy carriers. Shortly after 12:30, some 70 planes surprised and attacked the retiring Center Force, strafing and bombing through intense antiaircraft fire. Manila Bay launched her final strike at 12:45, strafing destroyers and getting two hits on a cruiser.

Later that afternoon, Manila Bays CAP intercepted a Japanese bomber-fighter strike about 50 miles north of Taffy 2. Her four fighters broke up the enemy formation, and with reinforcements drove off the attackers before they reached the carriers. Her planes continued to attack enemy ships the following day. Laden with rockets and bombs, one of her Avengers scored two hits on the cruiser  and several rocket hits on the destroyer . Both ships sank about noon in the Visayan Sea after numerous air attacks.

Manila Bay resumed air operations in support of Leyte ground forces on 27 October. During ground support and air cover missions, her planes shot down an Aichi D3A "Val" on 27 October and bagged two Nakajima Ki-43 "Oscars" on 29 October. Late on 30 October she sailed for the Admiralty Islands, arriving at Manus on 4 November.

Mindoro
After steaming to Kossol Passage late in November, Manila Bay departed on 10 December to provide air cover for the Mindoro invasion convoys. The task force entered Mindanao Sea early on 13 December. Late that afternoon in the Sulu Sea south of Negros, they encountered enemy aircraft. The fighter cover shot down or repulsed most of the attackers. Accurate fire from Manila Bay shot down one kamikaze. A second kamikaze hit the destroyer .

During and after the Mindoro landings on 15 December, Manila Bay sent her planes on ground support and air cover missions. As troops poured ashore, more kamikazes attempted to break the air cover and crash into ships of the covering and carrier group. The few that escaped the combat air patrols were either shot down or driven off by accurate antiaircraft fire. Manila Bay helped down three of the raiders and her fighters knocked out two more. After recovering her planes on 16 December, she sailed in convoy via Surigao Strait and reached Kossol on 19 December.

After a trip to Manus, Manila Bay sortied New Year's Day 1945 with ships of the Luzon Attack Force. With five other escort carriers she provided air cover for Vice Admiral Jesse B. Oldendorf's Bombardment and Fire Support Group, and direct air support for Vice Admiral Daniel E. Barbey's San Fabian Attack Force.

The task groups steamed via Surigao Strait and the Mindanao Sea into the Sulu Sea where they turned north for the Mindoro Strait. Enemy nuisance and suicide raids began in earnest on 4 January; and despite the tight air cover provided by CVE aircraft, a kamikaze crashed into the flight deck of  causing her to sink.

Lingayen Gulf
The enemy air attacks intensified on 5 January. Patrolling fighters broke up morning and early afternoon strikes, shooting down numerous raiders. At 16:50, a third attack sent all hands to general quarters. Vectored CAP shot down several enemy planes and anti-aircraft fire accounted for others. Three planes got through to the cruisers , the destroyer , and the Australian cruiser .

Kamikaze strike
Just before 17:50, two kamikazes dove at Manila Bay from the portside. The first plane hit the flight deck to starboard abaft the bridge, causing fires on the flight and hangar decks, destroying radar transmitting spaces, and wiping out all communications. The second plane, aimed for the bridge, missed the island close aboard to starboard and hit the sea off the fantail.

Firefighting parties promptly brought the blazes under control, including those of two fueled and burning torpedo planes in the hangar deck. Within 24 hours, she resumed limited air operations. Most repairs to her damaged electrical and communication circuits were completed by 9 January, when the amphibious invasion in Lingayen Gulf got underway.

Manila Bay had 14 men killed and 52 wounded, but by 10 January she resumed full duty in support of the Lingayen Gulf operations. In addition to providing air cover for the task force, her planes flew 104 sorties against targets in western Luzon. They gave effective close support for ground troops at Lingayen and San Fabian and bombed, rocketed, and strafed gun emplacements, buildings, truck convoys, and troop concentrations from Lingayen to Baguio.

Manila Bay departed in convoy late on 17 January. Steaming via Leyte, Ulithi, and Pearl Harbor, she arrived San Diego on 15 February. Battle damage repairs completed late in April, with VC-72 embarked she trained in Hawaiian waters until sailing for the western Pacific on 24 May. She closed the coast of Okinawa on 13 June and during the next week launched rocket and strafing strikes in the Ryukyu Islands. She departed for the Marianas on 20 June and operated out of Guam and Eniwetok during the closing weeks of the war.

Manila Bay steamed to the Aleutians in mid-August. As a unit of TF 44, she departed Adak Island on 31 August to support occupation operations in northern Japan. From 7–12 September her planes carried out photographic and reconnaissance missions over northern Honshū and southern Hokkaidō and dropped emergency supplies at POW camps. She returned to Pearl Harbor on 24 September, unloaded her aircraft, and steamed to the Marshall Islands carrying replacement troops.

Post-war
Assigned to "Magic Carpet" duty, Manila Bay embarked 1,031 veterans at Eniwetok, and from 6–18 October sailed to San Francisco. In November, the carrier aided the disabled Boeing 314 Honolulu Clipper 650 miles east of Oahu. After completing 2 more "Magic Carpet" runs, she departed Pearl Harbor on 27 January 1946 and reached Norfolk, Va. on 18 February.

She steamed to Boston from 15–17 April, decommissioned there on 31 July 1946, and entered the Atlantic Reserve Fleet. She was reclassified CVU-61 on 12 June 1955; her name was struck from the Navy list on 27 May 1958; and she was sold for scrap to Hugo Neu Corp., 2 September 1959.

Awards
Manila Bay received eight battle stars for World War II service.

References

External links

 Photo gallery at navsource.org

 

Casablanca-class escort carriers
World War II escort aircraft carriers of the United States
Ships built in Vancouver, Washington
1943 ships
S4-S2-BB3 ships